Downtown Hopewell Historic District is a national historic district located at Hopewell, Virginia. The district encompasses 38 contributing buildings in the central business district of Hopwell.  The district primarily includes masonry buildings, largely built after a devastating fire in 1915.  The scale is low with most buildings only two stories in height with decorative brick cornices and Art Deco features.  Notable buildings include the Wells Building, Larkin Building (1916), Randolph Hotel (1927), former National Bank of Hopewell (1916), D. L. Elder Bank (1929), and First Federal Savings and Loan building (1951).  Located in the district and separately listed are the Hopewell Municipal Building and Beacon Theatre.

It was listed on the National Register of Historic Places in 2002, with several subsequent boundary increases.

References

National Register of Historic Places in Hopewell, Virginia
Art Deco architecture in Virginia
Historic districts on the National Register of Historic Places in Virginia